Ochlesidae is a family of amphipods. The family Odiidae has sometimes been subsumed into Ochlesidae.

Four genera are included in the family:
Curidia Thomas, 1983
Meraldia Barnard & Karaman, 1987
Ochlesis Stebbing, 1910
Ochlesodius Ledoyer, 1982

References

Gammaridea
Taxa named by Thomas Roscoe Rede Stebbing
Crustacean families